Jordan and Mexico established diplomatic relations in 1975. Both nations are members of the United Nations.

History
Diplomatic relations between Jordan and Mexico were established on 9 July 1975. One month later, from August 10–13, 1975, Mexican President Luis Echeverría paid a state visit to Jordan. During President Echeverría's visit to Jordan, he discussed with Jordanian King Hussein on deepening economic and trade relations between both nations and spoke about the issues affecting the Middle East at the time.

In June 2000, Mexican Foreign Minister Rosario Green paid an official visit to Jordan. In September 2000, Mexican President Ernesto Zedillo met with King Abdullah II during the United Nations General Session in New York City. In March 2002, King Abdullah II visited the northern Mexican city of Monterrey to attend the International Conference on Financing for Development summit. During his visit, he met with Mexican President Vicente Fox. In February 2014, King Abdullah paid a second visit to Mexico and met with President Enrique Peña Nieto. During the King's visit, memorandums were signed to increase cooperation in education and cultural exchanges; to increase technical and bilateral relations and to explore a free trade agreement.

In July 2014, Mexican Foreign Minister José Antonio Meade paid a visit to Jordan and began negotiations on a free trade agreement with the country. During his visit, he announced that Mexico would open an embassy in the Jordanian capital. Foreign Minister Meade also paid a visit to the Syrian refugee camp of Zaatari to observe the humanitarian crisis facing the refugees. In 2015, both Jordan and Mexico opened embassies in each other's capitals respectively.

In 2015, Jordan and Mexico celebrated 40 years of diplomatic relations. In 2017, Princess Dina Mired of Jordan paid a visit to Mexico to attend the World Summit of Leaders Against Cancer. While in Mexico, Princess Dina met with Mexican President Enrique Peña Nieto.

High-level visits

High-level from Jordan to Mexico

 Queen Noor of Jordan (1984)
 King Abdullah II of Jordan (2002, 2014)
 Princess Dina Mired of Jordan (2017)

High-level visits from Mexico to Jordan

 President Luis Echeverría (1975)
 Foreign Minister Rosario Green (2000)
 Foreign Minister José Antonio Meade (2014)

Bilateral agreements
Both nations have signed several bilateral agreements such as a Memorandum of Understanding between Mexico's Secretariat of Tourism and Jordan's Ministry of Tourism and Antiquities (2014); Agreement of Technical Cooperation (2014); Agreement on Educational and Cultural Cooperation (2014); Memorandum of Understanding for the Establishment of a Mechanism of Consultation in Matters of Mutual Interest (2015); Memorandum of Understanding and Cooperation between both nations Diplomatic Institutions (2015); and a Memorandum of Understanding between the Mexican-Arab Chamber of Commerce and Industry (CAMIC) and the Jordanian Business Association (JBA) (2018).

Trade
In 2018, trade between Jordan and Mexico totaled US$44 million. Jordan's main exports to Mexico include: natural calcium phosphates, mineral or chemical fertilizers, mechanical appliances, and tailor suits. Mexico's main exports to Jordan include: vehicles for the transport of goods; tubes; antibiotics; nucleic acids and their salts; and passenger cars. Jordan is Mexico's 95th largest trading partner globally. In 2014, both nations began negotiations on a free trade agreement.

Resident diplomatic missions 
 Jordan has an embassy in Mexico City.
 Mexico has an embassy in Amman.

See also 
 Foreign relations of Jordan
 Foreign relations of Mexico

References

 
Mexico
Bilateral relations of Mexico